Victoria L is a 1982 Norwegian comedy film directed by Petter Vennerød and Svend Wam. The film was selected as the Norwegian entry for the Best Foreign Language Film at the 55th Academy Awards, but was not accepted as a nominee.

Cast
 Wenche Foss as Victoria Lund
 Pål Øverland as Carl
 Arne Bang-Hansen as Hilmar
 Monna Tandberg as Beatrice

See also
 List of submissions to the 55th Academy Awards for Best Foreign Language Film
 List of Norwegian submissions for the Academy Award for Best Foreign Language Film

References

External links
 

1982 films
1982 comedy films
Norwegian comedy films
1980s Norwegian-language films
Films directed by Svend Wam
Films directed by Petter Vennerød